Chupke Chupke may refer to:

 Chupke Chupke (film)
 Chupke Chupke (TV series)
 Chupke Chupke (TV series 2017)